Uns is an album by Brazilian singer Caetano Veloso, released in 1983.

Track listing
 "Uns" (Caetano Veloso)
 "Musical" (Péricles Cavalcanti)
 "Eclipse oculto" (Veloso)
 "Peter Gast" (Veloso)
 "Quero ir a Cuba" (Veloso)
 "Coisa mais linda" (Carlos Lyra, Vinícius de Moraes)
 "Você é linda" (Veloso)
 "Bobagens, meu filho, bobagens" (Marina Lima, Antonio Cícero)
 "A outra banda da terra" (Veloso)
 "Salva-vida" (Veloso)
 "É hoje" (Didi, Mestrinho)

Production

Coordination and assistance in production: Marcia Alvarez 
Recording engineer: Jairo Gualberto 
Auxiliary Studio: Manuel and Marcio 
Mixing and Editing: Jairo Gualberto João Augusto e Caetano Veloso 
Court: Ivan Lisnik 
Regimentation and copies: Clovis Mello 
Creation, typography and layout: Oscar Ramos 
Artwork: Jorge Vianna 
Cover photo (Caetano, Roberto and Rodrigo Veloso): Carlos Alexandre Moreira Salles 
Back Cover Photo: Arlete Kotchounian 
Color photography: Peter Farkas 
Graphic production: Edson Araujo

References

1983 albums
Caetano Veloso albums